The Center for Appropriate Transport (CAT) was a non-profit community center dedicated to bicycles and alternative transport located in Eugene, Oregon, United States.

CAT held publicly funded educational workshops for teaching youth from ages 12 to 21.  Within the  facility there was a public bicycle repair workspace and a bike machine-shop for the design and manufacture of special-purpose bikes, particularly cargo bikes and recumbents. There was also a bike museum on site, a bike rack-building workshop, and a sewing facility. CAT formerly held the offices of Oregon Cycling magazine, which ceased publishing in 2009. CAT is still currently home to Pedaler's Express, a pioneering workbike-based delivery service.

In 2021, the facility and programs were bought by the non-profit Better Eugene-Springfield Transportation (BEST). As of May 17, 2021: Sadly, the Center for Appropriate Transport in Eugene, Oregon is closed. Their website is now shut down.

History 
CAT was founded in 1992.

To create the center, Jan VanderTuin gathered the founding core group, which included bicycle retailer and activist Kurt Jensen, writer and racer Jason Moore, environmental activist Tom Bowerman, and Rain Magazine editors Greg Bryant and Danielle Janes. Bryant was instrumental in bringing Oregon Cycling into CAT, and obtaining non-profit status. CAT opened on November 20, 1992.

Within a few years CAT and Rain Magazine were no longer partners, and by 1995 the emphasis turned to youth education when CAT began contracting with local school districts to work with youth in need of a hands-on education. CAT is an alternative education program registered with the Oregon Department of Education and as such is one of the few publicly funded bicycle schools in the United States.

See also
Network Charter School

References

Further reading

External links
 

1992 establishments in Oregon
Alternative education
Community-building organizations
Cycling in Oregon
Cycling organizations in the United States
Human-powered vehicles
Non-profit organizations based in Oregon
Organizations based in Eugene, Oregon
Transportation in Lane County, Oregon
Transportation in Eugene, Oregon